Lapidary is the practice of shaping stone, minerals, or gemstones.

Lapidary may also refer to:
 Lapidary (text) a treatise on gemology, especially when pre-modern
 Old English Lapidary
 Lapidary Point, a headland on King George Island
 Lapidary style, a style of prose appropriate for memorials, mausoleums, stelae

See also 
 Lapidarium (disambiguation)